Crescent Mountain is a mountain in Linn County, Oregon. The mountain is located near the junction of U.S 20 and Highway 22. The mountain lies in the Willamette National Forest. The mountain is best known for its hike that leads to the top of the mountain. The top provides views of nearby mountains such as Mt. Jefferson.

References

Mountains of Oregon
Mountains of Linn County, Oregon

External links
Geological map